Colorina is a comune (municipality) in the Province of Sondrio in the Italian region Lombardy.  

It may also refer to:

 Colorina (Peruvian TV series), aired from 2017-present
 Colorina (Mexican TV series), aired from 1980 to 1981

See also
La Colorina, Chilean telenovela aired in 1977